Radovesnice II is a municipality and village in Kolín District in the Central Bohemian Region of the Czech Republic. It has about 500 inhabitants.

The Roman numeral in the name serves to distinguish it from the nearby municipality of the same name, Radovesnice I.

Administrative parts
The village of Rozehnaly is an administrative part of Radovesnice II.

References

Villages in Kolín District